Walram I of Nassau,  ( – 1 February 1198), also known as Walram I of Laurenburg, was Count of Nassau and is the oldest Nassau whose ancestorship is absolutely certain. He managed to expand his territory considerably during his reign. He took part in the Third Crusade.

Biography

Early life 

Walram was probably a son of Rupert II, Count of Laurenburg and an unknown woman. Possibly his mother was called Beatrix, it is uncertain whether that mention should not have been ‘grandmother’ (namely Beatrix of Limburg, daughter of Walram II ‘the Pagan’, Count of Limburg and Duke of Lower Lorraine and Jutta of Guelders (daughter of Gerard I, Count of Guelders).

Walram is mentioned between 1176 and 1191 as Count of Laurenburg and then, from 1193, as Count of Nassau. He seems to have had his residence at the Castle of Laurenburg first, which is why he used the title Count of Laurenburg, even when the name Nassau was already in use for a while in his house. In 1198, his widow still used the seal of Walram of Laurenburg. Walram ruled with his cousin Rupert III, and later with his son Herman, whom he eventually succeeded.

Territorial expansion 
Walram acquired the Herborner Mark, the Kalenberger Zent (including Mengerskirchen, Beilstein and Nenderoth, the second two now being parts of Greifenstein), and the Gericht Heimau (including Driedorf and Löhnberg) as a fief from the Landgraviate of Thüringen. In this way, Walram was able to make a connection between the family possessions the Vogtship of Weilburg (with its numerous property and lordship rights in the Westerwald and Dill River region), the castles of Laurenburg and Nassau on the River Lahn, and the Vogtship in the Siegerland (the region around the city of Siegen). The same period may also have brought the Lordship of the Westerwald (including Marienberg, Neukirch, and Emmerichenhain, now part of Rennerod). Walram also bought the Vogtships of Koblenz and Ems.

To the south of his possessions, Walram took over partial rule of the Einrichgau, later-named the Vierherrengericht (Four Lords’ Jurisdiction), with its main town of Marienfels. This had been part of the former Countship of Arnstein. On entering the monastery himself in 1139/1140, he had transferred control of Marienfels to his cousin Reginbold of Isenburg. In 1160, Reginbold sold it jointly to his cousins, the Counts of Nassau and Katzenelnbogen. The Nassau Counts were able to claim part of the inheritance through the marriage of their ancestor Dudo of Laurenburg with one of the seven daughters of Count Louis I of Arnstein.

Walram became affiliated with Holy Roman Emperor Frederick I Barbarrossa in the Peace of the Rhine Country in 1179. He placed his lands under the immediate suzerainty of the German king, rather than remaining a vassal of the archbishop of Trier. He would remain a loyal supporter of the Hohenstaufen Emperors. Walram's close ties with the imperial house were rewarded with Königshof Wiesbaden. At about the same time, he also received possession of the game rights in the forests of the Rheingau (a fief of the Archbishopric of Mainz), so that his rule extended over the Taunus, south to the Middle Rhine.

Walram had ongoing feuds with the neighboring houses of Eppstein, Solms, and Katzenelnbogen.

Third Crusade 
With his cousin Rupert III, Walram went to the Third Crusade (1189–1190). Walram probably took up the cross with the emperor on the Hoftag at Mainz on 27 March 1188. He was assigned an important task at the start of the journey. Together with his cousin Rupert and Count Henry of Diez, he formed the accompaniment of Bishop Herman II of Münster, who was envoy to Byzantine Emperor Isaac II Angelos in the fall of 1188. The delegation did arrive in Constantinople, but initially snubbed and then actually held as hostages by the Byzantine Emperor. They were set free as the crusade army approached. On 28 October 1189, Rupert and his companions rejoined the crusade army at Philippopolis. From that day, he disappears from the crusade army. The assumption that he was present at the formation of the Teutonic Order in Acre is, as far is known about its course, untenable. Nor is there sufficient evidence that at that time, contrary to his crusade vow, he left the crusade army. It is certain that in 1190, before the news of the death of the emperor arrived in Germany, Walram was a witness in a charter drawn up in Cologne by Archbishop Philip I of Cologne.

Subsequent years 
Little is known about the subsequent years of Walram. He is sometimes mentioned as a witness, also in imperial charters, but in general he seems to be far from the emperor and not to have participated in his military activities. On 6 November 1195, after the mediation and approval of Emperor Henry VI, Walram concluded with Bishop Henry I of Worms the important treaty for his house in which the mutual rights - the lordship rights of the bishop and the vogtship rights of the count - to the castle, the city and the lordship Weilburg were established. Castle and lordship Weilburg appear here for the first time as the property of the House of Nassau. In the years following the treaty of 6 November 1195, Walram appears to have stayed at the imperial court, where he participated in the Reichstag of Worms, at which the emperor negotiated a new crusade. It is certain that Walram did not participate in the German army in 1197, several mentionings as witness in charters prove that he did not leave the country.

Walram I died on 1 February 1198. He is buried in Arnstein Abbey. He was succeeded by his sons Henry II and Rupert IV.

Marriage and children 
Walram married a certain Kunigunde (died 8 November in or after 1198, last mentioned on 20 March 1198), possibly a daughter of a count of Sponheim or a daughter of count Poppo II of Ziegenhain. From this union came three children:
 Henry II ‘the Rich’ ( – 26 April 1247/48/49/50), Count of Nassau (1198–1247).
 Rupert IV (died after 1 January 1239), Count of Nassau (1198–1230) and Teutonic Knight (since 1230).
 Beatrix, mentioned in 1222 as a nun in Affolderbach Abbey near Nastätten.

Notes

References

Sources 
 
 
 
 
 
 
  Table 60.

External links 
 Die territoriale Entwicklung Nassaus by Ulrich Reuling. .
 Family tree of the House of Nassau
 Genealogies of the Middle Ages
 History of Marienfels and the Counts of Arnstein.
 Nassau in: Medieval Lands. A prosopography of medieval European noble and royal families, compiled by Charles Cawley.

Christians of the Third Crusade
Counts of Nassau
12th-century people of the Holy Roman Empire
1140s births
1198 deaths
Year of birth uncertain